In the 1182 campaign and Battle of Belvoir Castle, also called the Battle of Le Forbelet, a Crusader force led by King Baldwin IV of Jerusalem battled with an Ayyubid army from Egypt commanded by Saladin. The Crusaders successfully repelled Saladin's invasion effort. The theatre of operations included Ayla, the Transjordan, Galilee and Beirut.

Background 
Saladin was appointed commander of the Syrian troops and vizier of the Fatimid caliph in Egypt in 1169 and established the Ayyubid Sultanate soon after. He slowly began extending his dominion over Muslim emirates in Syria formerly held by Nur ad-Din. In 1177, Saladin mounted a major invasion of the Kingdom of Jerusalem from Egypt and was defeated by Baldwin IV (the "Leper King") at the Battle of Montgisard. Henceforth, the Muslim leader learned to outdo the young Crusader king's military talents. In 1179, Saladin thoroughly defeated Baldwin at the Battle of Marj Ayyun in Lebanon.

In 1180, Saladin arranged a truce between himself and two Christian leaders, King Baldwin and Raymond III of Tripoli to prevent bloodshed. But two years later, the lord of the Transjordan fief of Kerak, Reynald of Châtillon, ruthlessly attacked Muslim caravans passing through his lands on their way for pilgrimage, breaking pacts for the safe passage of pilgrims. Resenting this violation of the truce, Saladin immediately assembled his army and prepared to strike, devastating the enemy.

Campaign 
On 11 May 1182 Saladin left Egypt and led his army north toward Damascus via Ayla on the Red Sea. As he moved north, his army entered lands belonging to the fiefs of Montreal (Shobak) and Kerak. Saladin encamped at Jerba and launched raids on Montreal, which did great damage to the crops. At a council of war, the Crusader princes pondered two courses of action. They could move across the Jordan River to protect the exposed fiefs. Raymond of Tripoli argued against this strategy, saying that would leave too few soldiers to protect the kingdom. The aggressive Baldwin overruled Raymond and the Crusader army moved to Petra in the Jordan, thus defending the lands of his vassal.

Meanwhile, Saladin's nephew, Farrukh Shah, led a force from Damascus to ravage the now-undefended Latin Principality of Galilee. In this destructive raid, the emirs of Bosra, Baalbek and Homs and their followers joined Farrukh. Before returning to Damascus, the raiders seized the cave castle of Habis Jaldak in the Yarmuk Valley from its weak Frankish garrison.

Out in the Transjordan, the main armies still faced each other. A Frankish plan was proposed to occupy the water points, thus forcing Saladin into the desert, but the Crusaders were unable to carry this out. The Muslim commander moved north and reached Damascus on 22 June. The Crusaders recrossed the Jordan into Galilee and concentrated their army at La Sephorie, six miles northwest of Nazareth.

After a three-week breathing spell, Saladin marched out of the Damascus on 11 July and advanced to Al-Quhwana on the southern shore of the Sea of Galilee. From there he sent forces to raid the Jordan valley, Grand Gerin (Jenin) and the district of St Jean d'Acre. One raiding column attacked Bethsan but was driven off. Saladin took his main army, crossed to the west side of the Jordan and moved south along the high ground.

Battle 
As soon as reconnaissance patrols revealed the Muslim leader's maneuver, the Frankish leaders determined to move their field army into close contact with Saladin's army. After adding reinforcements by stripping nearby castles of most of their garrisons, the Crusader army marched to Tiberias then turned south. In the vicinity of Belvoir castle (Arabic name: Kaukab al-Hawa), Baldwin's men spent the night in their closely guarded camp. The next morning, the Ayyubid army confronted the Crusaders.

The Franks advanced in their usual formation when in contact with their enemies. The infantry marched in close order, with the spearmen guarding against direct attack and archers keeping the Saracens at a distance. Shielded by the footmen, the cavalry conformed to the pace of the infantry, ready to drive back their enemies with controlled charges. The Crusaders had successfully used this method of fighting in the Battle of Shaizar (1111) and the Battle of Bosra (1147).

For their part, Saladin's soldiers tried to disrupt the Crusader formation by raining arrows from their horse archers, by partial attacks and by feigned retreats. "It is likely that from time to time the Turks came to close quarters, and this has caused some writers to refer to the action as a battle. It is more probable that although there were short episodes in which there was hard fighting, there was no pitched engagement." On this occasion, the Franks could neither be tempted into fighting a pitched battle nor stopped. Unable to make an impression on the Latin host, Saladin broke off the running battle and returned to Damascus.

Aftermath 
Saladin was not finished yet. He had arranged for an Egyptian fleet to attack Beirut. As soon as his scouts had spotted the fleet from the Lebanese mountains, Saladin left Damascus, marched through the Munaitra Pass and laid siege to Beirut. At the same time, a force from Egypt raided the southern part of the kingdom, doing further local damage. Baldwin recalled his army to La Sephorie, then marched to Tyre. From there he appropriated shipping and organized an attempt to relieve the port of Beirut by both land and sea. When Saladin heard of these efforts, he raised the siege and destroyed the attempts in August 1182.

The tireless Saladin spent the next twelve months campaigning in Syria and Mesopotamia, adding Aleppo and a number of other cities to his growing empire. He would invade the Kingdom of Jerusalem again in September 1183. Free of his adversary, in October 1182, Baldwin recovered Habis Jaldak in the Transjordan. In December, Raymond of Tripoli launched a raid in the same area and Baldwin took a mounted force within a few miles of Damascus. But these were mere pinpricks. Not long afterward, Baldwin became completely incapacitated by leprosy and was forced to appoint his sister Sibylla's husband Guy of Lusignan as regent.

Commentary 
The Crusaders kept their enemies from capturing any strongholds and kept their field army intact, so they succeeded in their strategic purpose. But Saladin's raiders managed to inflict great damage on the countryside. Frankish overlords depended on the rents of their tenants, but these could not be collected if the crops were ruined. Without money, the lords could not pay their soldiers. Therefore, constant devastations would ultimately reduce the Frankish kingdom to a state of helplessness.

Saladin forced the Crusaders into a cruel dilemma. They could concentrate their field army to resist the Muslim main army. Or, they could guard against damaging raids. They could not do both because their military power was limited. "A single mistake on the part of a Frankish commander could lose the field army, the fortresses, and with them the whole kingdom." This finally happened in 1187 at the Battle of Hattin. First, the campaign and Battle of Al-Fule would be fought.

Related battles 
 1177: Battle of Montgisard
 1179: Battle of Marj Ayyun
 1179: Battle of Jacob's Ford
 1183: Battle of Al-Fule
 1187: Battle of Cresson
 1187: Battle of Hattin

References

Bibliography 
 Beeler, John. Warfare in Feudal Europe, 730–1200. Ithaca, New York: Cornell University, 1971. 
 Smail, R. C. Crusading Warfare, 1097–1193. New York: Barnes & Noble Books, (1956) 1995. 

Belvoir
Battles involving the Ayyubids
Battles involving Egypt
Conflicts in 1182
1182 in Asia
Belvoir
1180s in the Kingdom of Jerusalem